Kasimkota railway station (station code:KSK),is an Indian Railways station near Anakapalle, a neighbourhood of Visakhapatnam in Andhra Pradesh. It lies on the Vijayawada–Chennai section and is administered under Vijayawada railway division of South Central Railway zone.

History 
The southern part of the East Coast State Railway (from Waltair to Vijayawada) was taken over by Madras Railway in 1901.

Classification 

Kasimkota railway station is an D–category station of Vijayawada division.

References

External links 

Railway stations in Visakhapatnam district
Vijayawada railway division